Avondale Park was a  cargo ship which was built by Pictou Shipyard at Pictou, Nova Scotia in 1944. She was the last merchant ship to be sunk by Germany in the Second World War, on 7 May 1945, the day of German surrender. She was built as merchant steamship constructed for Canada’s Merchant Navy in 1944 as part of Canada's Park ship program.

Description
The ship was built by Foundation Maritime Limited's Pictou Shipyard in Pictou, Nova Scotia. She was launched in February 1944, and completed in May 1944.

She had a GRT of 2,878 and a NRT of 1,653.

She was propelled by a triple expansion steam engine which had cylinders ,  and  diameter by  stroke. The engine was built by Canada Iron Foundries, Three Rivers, Quebec.

History
Avondale Park was built for the Canadian Government and operated by the Park Steamship Co Ltd. The United Kingdom Official Number 175378 and code letters VDDN were allocated. Her port of registry was Montreal, under the British flag. She was later chartered by the Ministry of War Transport, who placed her under the management of Witherington & Etheridge, Newcastle upon Tyne.

Avondale Park was a member of Convoy EN 491, which departed Hull on 6 May 1945 bound for Belfast via Methil. The sinking, at just after 23:00 on 7 May 1945, was in the last hours of the Second World War in Europe, with the official surrender taking place at 23:01 on 8 May 1945. Two of the 38 crew were lost. A signal had been sent to the U-boats on 4 May 1945 ordering them to surrender but U-2336 did not receive the signal.

See also
 Actions of 7–8 May 1945

References

1944 ships
Ships built in Nova Scotia
World War II merchant ships of Canada
Steamships of Canada
Ministry of War Transport ships
World War II merchant ships of the United Kingdom
Steamships of the United Kingdom
Ships sunk by German submarines in World War II
World War II shipwrecks in the North Sea
Maritime incidents in May 1945
Fleet of the Canadian Merchant Navy